Peckhamia may refer to:

 Peckhamia (spider), a genus of jumping spiders
 Peckhamia (journal), a scientific journal dedicated to research on jumping spiders